The Laborers’ Party of Iran (or simply Ranjbaran) is an Iranian Maoist political party in exile.

An advocate of the Three Worlds Theory, the party supported Abolhassan Banisadr and was banned in 1981.

References

External links

1979 establishments in Iran
Anti-imperialist organizations
Banned communist parties
Banned political parties in Iran
Communist parties in Iran
Communist parties in Sweden
International Conference of Marxist–Leninist Parties and Organizations (International Newsletter)
International Coordination of Revolutionary Parties and Organizations
Labour parties
Left-wing militant groups
Maoist organisations in Iran
Maoist parties
Marxist organizations
Militant opposition to the Islamic Republic of Iran
Political parties established in 1979
Political parties of the Iranian Revolution